is the fifth single by the Japanese rock group Stereopony under label of gr8! Records on November 4, 2009. The single's main track "Tsukiakari no Michishirube" is the opening theme for the anime series Darker than Black: Gemini of the Meteor.

In an Anime News Network poll, "Tsukiakari no Michishirube" was voted as one of the best openings from 2009. About.com also praised the song while reviewing the anime of Gemini of the Meteor.

Track listing
 
 
 "Fuzz"
 "Tsukiakari no Michishirube" ～Instrumental～

Oricon Sales Chart (Japan)

References

2009 singles
2009 songs
Stereopony songs
Anime songs
Gr8! Records singles